Park Gi-Dong (Hanja: 朴基棟;  born 1 November 1988) is a South Korean professional football forward, who plays for Gimhae City FC.

Career
Park began his professional football career with Japanese club FC Gifu in 2010. In his one-year Park appeared in 8 matches and scored 1 goal.

Park was drafted a fledgling team Gwangju FC in the 2011 K-League Draft. He has been made captain for the 2011 season.

Club statistics

External links

Gwangju FC Official website 

1988 births
Living people
Association football forwards
South Korean footballers
South Korean expatriate footballers
South Korea international footballers
FC Gifu players
Gwangju FC players
Jeju United FC players
Jeonnam Dragons players
Gimcheon Sangmu FC players
Suwon Samsung Bluewings players
Gyeongnam FC players
Daegu FC players
J2 League players
K League 1 players
K League 2 players
Expatriate footballers in Japan
South Korean expatriate sportspeople in Japan
Sportspeople from Daejeon